The Central Archives of the State (in Italian: Archivio centrale dello Stato) are the main national archives of Italy. They were created in 1875 under the name of Royal Archives. They took their present name in 1953. They are located in EUR, Rome and are put under the responsibility of the Ministry of Culture.

However, each of the 103 Italian provinces has its own state archive, keeping the public documents created in that territory and, mainly, the state archives of the Italian historical states.

Further reading

Archives

Archivio Centrale dello Stato, a cura di Paola Carucci, in Guida Generale degli Archivi di Stato Italiani, vol. I, pp. 33–295, Roma 1981.
L’Archivio Centrale dello Stato: 1953/1993, a cura di Mario Serio, Roma, 1993, pp. XVI,611, (Pubblicazioni degli archivi di Stato. Saggi, 27).
EUR, Guida degli Istituti culturali, a cura dell’Archivio Centrale dello Stato e dell’Ente EUR, Milano, 1995, pp. 185.
Paola Carucci, Gli Archivi di Stato, in Storia d’Italia nel secolo ventesimo. Strumenti e fonti, a cura di Claudio Pavone, vol. II, pp. 55–129, Roma, 2006 (Pubblicazioni degli archivi di Stato, Saggi, 88).

Library

Renato Grispo, La biblioteca dell’Archivio Centrale dello Stato. Storia, funzioni, organizzazione, in Rassegna degli Archivi di Stato, 1962, 1, pp. 33–46.
Vittorio Stella, La biblioteca dell’Archivio Centrale dello Stato. Natura e prospettive di sviluppo, in Rassegna degli Archivi di Stato, 1962, 1, pp. 47–61.
Giovanni Paoloni, La biblioteca dell’Archivio Centrale dello Stato, in Rivista trimestrale di diritto pubblico, 1986, 3, pp. 914–923.
Eugenia Nieddu, La biblioteca dell’Archivio Centrale dello Stato, in Le biblioteche dell’amministrazione centrale dello Stato, a cura di Madel Crasta, Sandro Bulgarelli, Patrizia Valentini, pp. 93–100, Roma, 1990.
 Amedeo Benedetti, La Biblioteca dell'Archivio Centrale dello Stato, in "Culture del testo e del documento", a. 11, n. 31, 2010, pp. 93–98.

External links 
 Central Archives of the State (in Italian only)

National archives
Italian culture
Royal Archives
Rome Q. XXXII Europa